Omak is a city located in the foothills of the Okanogan Highland in north-central Washington, United States.

Omak may also refer to:

 Omak Airport, an airport located in Riverside, Washington
 Omak Lake, a lake located in Okanogan County, Washington
 Omak Rock, a balancing rock located in Okanogan County, Washington
 Omakase, a Japanese term defining "to entrust"
 Omakau, a community located in New Zealand
 Omake, a Japanese term defining "extra"
 Omak Apang, Indian politician

See also